Elmwood Place is a village in Hamilton County, Ohio, United States. The population was 2,087 at the 2020 census. Except for a small portion which touches neighboring St. Bernard, Elmwood Place is nearly surrounded by the city of Cincinnati.

History
Elmwood Place was laid out in 1875. The community originally built up chiefly by German Catholics. The village incorporated in 1890.

Geography
Elmwood Place is located at  (39.185608, -84.487842).

Demographics

2010 census
As of the census of 2010, there were 2,188 people, 872 households, and 477 families living in the village. The racial makeup of the village was 79.1% White, 14.9% African American, 0.3% Native American, 0.7% Asian, 0.5% Pacific Islander, 1.0% from other races, and 3.6% from two or more races. Hispanic or Latino of any race were 3.6% of the population.

There were 872 households, of which 32.7% had children under the age of 18 living with them, 27.5% were married couples living together, 21.1% had a female householder with no husband present, 6.1% had a male householder with no wife present, and 45.3% were non-families. 35.6% of all households were made up of individuals, and 8.6% had someone living alone who was 65 years of age or older. The average household size was 2.51 and the average family size was 3.30.

The median age in the village was 35.2 years. 26.6% of residents were under the age of 18; 10.4% were between the ages of 18 and 24; 25.8% were from 25 to 44; 27.4% were from 45 to 64; and 9.6% were 65 years of age or older. The gender makeup of the village was 50.7% male and 49.3% female.

2000 census
As of the census of 2000, there were 2,681 people, 1,061 households, and 658 families living in the village. The population density was 8,106.5 people per square mile (3,136.8/km2). There were 1,173 housing units at an average density of 3,546.8 per square mile (1,372.4/km2). The racial makeup of the village was 91.87% White, 5.45% African American, 0.56% Native American, 0.19% Asian, 0.07% Pacific Islander, 0.67% from other races, and 1.19% from two or more races. Hispanic or Latino of any race were 1.64% of the population.

There were 1,061 households, out of which 33.1% had children under the age of 18 living with them, 36.7% were married couples living together, 18.8% had a female householder with no husband present, and 37.9% were non-families. 32.0% of all households were made up of individuals, and 7.5% had someone living alone who was 65 years of age or older. The average household size was 2.53 and the average family size was 3.23.

In the village, the population was spread out, with 29.2% under the age of 18, 9.8% from 18 to 24, 29.8% from 25 to 44, 21.0% from 45 to 64, and 10.1% who were 65 years of age or older. The median age was 33 years. For every 100 females there were 104.7 males. For every 100 females age 18 and over, there were 102.8 males.

The median income for a household in the village was $29,017, and the median income for a family was $31,528. Males had a median income of $29,902 versus $21,812 for females. The per capita income for the village was $13,466. About 20.2% of families and 19.0% of the population were below the poverty line, including 26.9% of those under age 18 and 7.3% of those age 65 or over.

References

Villages in Hamilton County, Ohio
Villages in Ohio
1875 establishments in Ohio
Populated places established in 1875